Mure is a surname. Notable people with the surname include:

 Benoît Jules Mure (1809—1858), French homeopath, naturalist, and anarcho-communist
 David Mure, Lord Mure (1810–1891), Scottish lawyer and politician
 Elizabeth Mure ( 1320– 1355), first wife of Scottish King Robert II
 John Mure ( 1776–1823), Canadian businessman and politician
 G. R. G. Mure (1893–1979), British philosopher and academic
 Pierre La Mure (1909–1976), French author
 Robert Mure of Caldwell (died 1620), Scottish landowner
 William Mure (disambiguation), multiple people

See also
 Reginald de Mure (died 1340), Scottish noble, twice Lord Chamberlain of Scotland
 Pierre La Mure (1909–1976), French author